Marrit Boonstra (born 25 September 1988) is a former professional tennis player from the Netherlands.

Biography
Boonstra, who was born in Groningen, played tennis as a right-hander with a two-handed backhand.

Her junior career included a win over Caroline Wozniacki, whom she also partnered to make the girls' doubles quarterfinals of the 2006 Wimbledon Championships.

As a 17-year-old, she played three doubles rubbers for the Netherlands in the 2006 Fed Cup competition, teaming up with Dutch veteran Brenda Schultz-McCarthy to win all three matches.

Boonstra received a wildcard to compete in the main draw of the 2006 Ordina Open, a WTA Tour tournament in Rosmalen. She lost in the opening round to Jelena Janković.

From 2008 to 2010, she played collegiate tennis in the United States for the University of Florida.

During her time on the ITF Circuit, she won one singles title and five doubles titles.

ITF finals

Singles (1–2)

Doubles (5–4)

See also
 List of Netherlands Fed Cup team representatives

References

External links
 
 
 

1988 births
Living people
Dutch female tennis players
Florida Gators women's tennis players
Sportspeople from Groningen (city)
20th-century Dutch women
21st-century Dutch women